Shingle Creek is a neighborhood within the Camden community in the U.S. city of Minneapolis. Located in the far northwestern corner of the city, the neighborhood is named after the creek that runs through it. The boundaries of Shingle Creek are 53rd Avenue North to the north, Humboldt Avenue North to the east, 49th Avenue North to the south, and Xerxes Avenue North to the west.

References

External links

 Minneapolis Neighborhood Profile - Shingle Creek

Neighborhoods in Minneapolis